The Renner–Teller effect is observed in the spectra of molecules having electronic states that allow vibration through a linear configuration. For such molecules electronic states that are doubly degenerate at linearity (Π, Δ, ..., etc.) will split into two close-lying nondegenerate states for non-linear configurations. As part of the Renner–Teller effect, the rovibronic levels of such a pair of states will be strongly Coriolis coupled by the rotational kinetic energy operator causing a breakdown of the Born-Oppenheimer approximation. This is to be contrasted with the Jahn–Teller effect which occurs for polyatomic molecules in electronic states that allow vibration through a symmetric nonlinear configuration, where the electronic state is degenerate, and which further involves a breakdown of the Born-Oppenheimer approximation but here caused by the vibrational kinetic energy operator.   
 
In its original formulation, the Renner–Teller effect was discussed for a triatomic molecule in a degenerate electronic state that has a linear equilibrium configuration. The 1934 article by Rudolf Renner was one of the first that considered dynamic effects that go beyond the Born–Oppenheimer approximation, in which the nuclear and electronic motions in a molecule are uncoupled. This is a good approximation when the electronic energies are well separated. However, in linear molecules many of the electronic states are two-fold degenerate due to C∞v or D∞h  symmetry, and the Born–Oppenheimer approximation breaks down significantly.  Since the best-known linear triatomic molecule (CO2) is electronically non-degenerate in its ground state, Renner chose the electronically excited two-fold  degenerate  Π-state of this well-known molecule as a model for his studies. The products of purely electronic and purely nuclear rovibrational states served as the zeroth-order (no rovibronic coupling) wave functions in Renner's study. The rovibronic coupling acts as a perturbation.

Because Renner is the only author of the 1934 paper that first described the effect, it can be called simply the Renner effect. Renner did this work as a PhD student under the supervision of Teller and presumably Teller was perfectly happy not to be a coauthor. However, in 1933 Gerhard Herzberg and Edward Teller had recognized that the potential of a triatomic linear molecule in a degenerate electronic state splits into two when the molecule is bent. A year later this effect was worked out in detail by Renner. Herzberg refers to this as the "Renner–Teller" effect in one of his influential books, and this name is most commonly used.

While Renner's theoretical study concerned carbon dioxide, a linear triatomic molecule, the first actual observation of the Renner–Teller effect was in an electronic excited state of the NH2 molecule which is bent at equilibrium.

Much has been published about the Renner–Teller effect since its first experimental observation in 1959; see the bibliography on pages 412-413 of the textbook by Bunker and Jensen. Section 13.4 of this textbook discusses both the Renner–Teller effect (called the Renner effect) and the Jahn–Teller effect.

See also

References

External links
 English translation of Renner's paper (1934).
 H. Hettema's English translation of Renner's paper (1934) on Google books
  The original Renner–Teller effect, Paul E. S. Wormer, University of Nijmegen (2003)

Molecular physics
Spectroscopy
Edward Teller